The LMS (Northern Counties Committee) Class A1 4-4-0 passenger steam locomotives were rebuilds of Belfast and Northern Counties Railway Class A two-cylinder compound locomotives. They operated services throughout the NCC’s  broad gauge system in the north-east of Ireland.

History 
The Class A1 locomotives were rebuilds of the Class A "Heavy Compounds" that had been designed by the BNCR Locomotive Engineer Bowman Malcolm. The first Class A locomotive had been built by the BNCR at York Road, Belfast in 1901 shortly before amalgamation with the Midland Railway and building continued with the Midland Railway constructing six at their  Derby works.

Following the end of World War I the state of the locomotives operating in Northern Ireland was well below that which was needed to run the services effectively; many needed replacing but, however, cost was a major factor. It was decided to implement a "Renewal Programme" in which, not only would new locomotives be built but also suitable classes of locomotives would be rebuilt, in the main following the style of the Midland Railway and the  LMS.

As part of this "Renewal Programme" members of Class A were rebuilt as two-cylinder simples (i.e. not compounds). Those reclassified as Class A1 were rebuilt with a Midland Railway type RG6 boiler and new cylinders both of  diameter by  stroke. Although the effect was less striking than that of the similarly rebuilt Class B3, the modified appearance was such that these locomotives would be included among those that gained the nickname of "Whippet" because of a perceived resemblance to the racing dog. 
 
All the class were officially named after mountains although that allocated to No. 58, Lurigethan, was never carried.

No.58 acquired a tender cab which led to her being a regular visitor on the Dungiven branch where tender first running was required.

This led to their being allocated to the Belfast area during the late 1930s where duties were more onerous. No.33 was shedded at York Road while the other two were at Larne.

No.65 worked in a spare capacity at York Road and No.62 was based at Cookstown.

The builders plates showing dates in the late 1920s and early 1930s belied the age of these engines and the heavy traffic that they handled during World War II showed up their weaknesses more than newly built locomotives. Nevertheless, the majority of the class survived to be taken into Ulster Transport Authority stock and were scrapped in the mid 1950s.

Building and withdrawal data

Rebuilding and naming information for the members of Class A1 are shown in the table below:

* Allocated the name shown but this was never carried.

Livery

LMS NCC

The Class A1 locomotives were painted in crimson lake with yellow and black lining. The LMS crest was carried on the upper cab sides. The initials "NCC" in shaded serif gold capital letters were placed centrally on the tender sides. Number plates were brass with raised digits and edge; they were carried on the lower cab sides with another placed centrally on the back of the tender tank. On the named engines, curved nameplates were fitted above the leading driving wheel splashers.  Buffer beams and number plate and name plate backgrounds were painted red. The engine number was applied to the front buffer beam in shaded gold digits.

During World War II, the locomotives were painted black with red buffer beams and number plate and name plate backgrounds providing relief.

UTA

Under the Ulster Transport Authority, the engines were painted black with vermilion and yellow lining. Buffer beams, name and number plate backgrounds were red and the practice of putting the number on the front buffer beam was continued.

The UTA roundel,  in diameter, with "Ulster Transport" in orange block capitals, lined in red, surrounding a white shield bearing the red hand of Ulster, all on a mid-green background, was placed in the middle of the tender sides.

References
 
 
 

A1
Steam locomotives of Northern Ireland
4-4-0 locomotives
Steam locomotives of Ireland
Passenger locomotives
5 ft 3 in gauge locomotives
Railway locomotives introduced in 1901
Scrapped locomotives